8213: Gacy House, or Paranormal Entity 2: Gacy House, is a 2010 American horror film written and directed by Anthony Fankhauser and distributed by The Asylum. It is a mockbuster of the film Paranormal Activity 2.

Plot
A group of paranormal investigators enter the abandoned home of serial killer John Gacy, hoping to find evidence of paranormal activity. Upon entering the house they set up cameras throughout the abandoned house while going room to room with hand-held cameras, performing séances and asking for John Gacy to come forward. As the evening progresses it seems the investigators are not prepared for the horror still within the house. In the end all hell breaks loose, Gary finds Mike's dead body in the basement, Gary is dragged away, Franklin disappears and Robbie is chased through the house. After the rest of the cameras cut to static, an apparition of Gacy appears, Robbie is then taken and his camera cuts to static.

Sequels

References

External links
 
 

2010 films
2010s English-language films
2010 horror films
American supernatural horror films
Mockbuster films
Films shot in Los Angeles
The Asylum films
Found footage films
Films about John Wayne Gacy
2010 independent films
Films set in abandoned houses
2010s supernatural horror films
2010s American films